The 2014 Billboard Music Awards ceremony was held on May 18, 2014, at the MGM Grand Garden Arena in Las Vegas, Nevada. It aired live on ABC at 8:00/7:00 PM Central. The show was hosted by Ludacris.

Justin Timberlake won 7 out of his 11 nominations, including Top Artist, Top Male Artist and top Billboard 200 Artist for The 20/20 Experience. Other winners included Imagine Dragons who won five of their 12 nominations and Robin Thicke, Pharrell Williams and T.I. scoring four trophies each. Lorde had 12 nominations. Katy Perry had 10 nominations, including top artist, top female and Hot 100 artist. Miley Cyrus received nine nominations, including top artist, top female, Hot 100 artist and top streaming artist. Macklemore & Ryan Lewis had eight nominations, including top duo/group. At the ceremony, Jennifer Lopez received the Icon Award. 

The 2014 Billboard Music Awards had performances by Shakira, One Republic, John Legend, Lorde, Jason Derulo, Carrie Underwood, Miley Cyrus, among others. It was produced by Dick Clark Productions. Allen Shapiro and Mike Mahan were executive producers, with Barry Adelman, Mark Bracco, and Larry Klein as producers.

Performances

Pre-show

Main show

Resident DJ
 Tiesto

Winners and nominees
Winners are listed first.

Artists with multiple wins and nominations

References

External links
 Official awards website

2014
Billboard awards
2014 in American music
2014 in Nevada
2014 music awards
MGM Grand Garden Arena